Robert John Haywood (3 March 1858 – 9 May 1922) was an English cricketer. He was born at Eltham in Kent and played one first-class cricket match for Kent County Cricket Club in 1878.

He was, according to his Wisden obituary, "well known in metropolitan cricket" and died at Eltham in May 1922 aged 64. His oldest son Robert had a lengthy first-class career for Northamptonshire County Cricket Club and his younger son Archie played for Kent's Second XI either side of the First World War and coached at Taunton School. His grandson, also called Robert, played one first-class match for Scotland in 1949.

References

External links

1858 births
1922 deaths
People from Eltham
English cricketers
Kent cricketers